Eulepte alialis is a moth in the family Crambidae. It was described by Achille Guenée in 1854. It is found in French Guiana, Peru, Costa Rica and Mexico.

References

Moths described in 1854
Spilomelinae
Moths of North America
Moths of South America